The Crew  is an Australian TV show, which follows three friends through life chasing their dreams.

See also

 Fighting Fear
 Bra Boys: Blood is Thicker than Water

References

External links
 
 

Television shows set in New South Wales
English-language television shows
Australian sports television series
2010s Australian documentary television series
2013 Australian television series debuts
2010s Australian reality television series